Rob Elloway (born 9 November 1983) is a former German international rugby union player, playing for the Cornish Pirates in the RFU Championship and the German rugby team.

Biography
Born in Rinteln, Germany, he has played rugby since 1990. He was born on a British Army base in Germany to an English father and a German mother, thereby qualifying to play for Germany.

Elloway, from a rugby playing family, his father Kevin Elloway, a Royal Engineers, represented his corps at rugby. He was educated at Sedbergh School and played junior rugby at Sedgley Park. Elloway made a number of appearances for Gloucester Rugby, spent some time at Pertemps Bees on loan in the 2006–07 season before joining the Cornish Pirates in 2007.

He made his debut for Germany against Russia on 2 May 2009.

Stats
Rob Elloway's personal statistics in club and international rugby (incomplete):

Club

 As of 15 April 2017

National team

 As of 14 May 2017

References

External links
 Rob Elloway at scrum.com
  Rob Elloway at totalrugby.de
 Rob Elloway at the Cornish Pirates website

1983 births
Living people
English rugby union players
German rugby union players
English rugby union coaches
Germany international rugby union players
German people of English descent
People educated at Sedbergh School
People from Rinteln
Rugby union hookers
Rugby union players from Yorkshire
Sportspeople from Gloucestershire
Birmingham & Solihull R.F.C. players
Cornish Pirates players
Gloucester Rugby players
Sedgley Park R.U.F.C. players
Sportspeople from Lower Saxony